Katayka (Qatay) is a rural locality (a village) in Nursky Selsoviet, Beloretsky District, Bashkortostan, Russia. The population was 23 as of 2010. There are 12 streets.

Geography 
Katayka is located 12 km north of Beloretsk (the district's administrative centre) by road. Shushpa is the nearest rural locality.

References 

Rural localities in Beloretsky District